The Apartment is an album led by saxophonist Dexter Gordon recorded in 1974 and released on the Danish SteepleChase label.

Reception

In his review for AllMusic, Scott Yanow said "While in Europe, tenor-sax-great Dexter Gordon recorded many sessions with pianist Kenny Drew, bassist Niels Pedersen and drummer Albert "Tootie" Heath. All are worth acquiring and this one is no exception".

Track listing
All compositions by Dexter Gordon except where noted.
 "The Apartment" - 5:57 		
 "Wee-Dot" (J. J. Johnson) - 7:34 		
 "Old Folks" (Dedette Lee Hill, Willard Robison) - 7:23
 "Strollin'" (Horace Silver) - 7:53
 "Candlelight Lady" - 8:52
 "Stablemates" (Benny Golson) - 6:04 Bonus track on CD release 		
 "Antabus" - 4:42

Personnel
Dexter Gordon - tenor saxophone
Kenny Drew - piano
Niels-Henning Ørsted Pedersen - bass 
Albert Heath - drums

References

1975 albums
Dexter Gordon albums
SteepleChase Records albums